Langford M. Peel (1829/1831 – July 21, 1867), also known as Farmer Peel was a soldier,gunman, and gambler in the American Old West. According to his grave marker, Langford was born in Liverpool, England. At age 12 he enlisted in the U.S. Army with the approval and help of his mother and stepfather. At the age of 17, he enlisted as a bugler in "B' Company of the 1st US Dragoons under Captain Edwin Vose Sumner; Peel, still under 20 years of age, when he killed his first three Indians at the Battle of Coon Creek in 1846.  In 1850 he killed two more near Fort Kearney Kansas and a sixth later. Peel "was the best specimen of 160 pounds, five feet, nine inches, naturally bright, clear headed and helpful always."  Sgt. Percivel Lowe would go on to say that a "full set of such noncommissioned officers under a good commander would make a troop [ or company] invincible against any reasonable odds." At the time of his First Sergeant's (Percival Lowe) honorable discharge from the army in 1854, Langford was married and had a two year old son living on the fort, named after his 1st Sgt: Percival Lowe Peel. He traveled to Leavenworth, Kansas; Salt Lake City; Nevada; and eventually to Helena, Montana.

One evening while walking down the sidewalk in Helena, arm in arm, with his girlfriend, a former associate of his, John Bull, sprang from a black alley and shot Peel once in the upper chest.  Peel's girlfriend gripped his gun arm so hard from fear, that Peel had to use extra force to free his shooting arm from her, but it was too late, those precious 2 seconds brought him another bullet from Bull, and as Peel lay on the ground dying, Bull finished him off. The defendant was acquitted August 24, 1867. Bull was later involved in the stabbing of a railroad baggageman and also in 1874 was indicted in Omaha Nebraska for involvement with others on a robbery charge [one of the defendants escaped and the rest were freed]. In 1879, he had a faro game at the Sacramento State Fair; Bull was killed in Denver, Colorado on January 9, 1882 by a fellow gambler Jim Bush.

Alleged by some sources to have been Harvard educated, Peel was known for always giving any opponent a chance in a gunfight.

Mark Twain, in his book Roughing It, refers (perhaps as an inside joke) to Peel as "Farmer Pease".

References

Lowe, Percival G. (1965). ''Five Years A Dragoon,('49 to '54) And Other Adventures on the Great Plains.  University of Oklahoma Press.

1831 births
1867 deaths
Military personnel from Liverpool
English emigrants to the United States
Gunslingers of the American Old West
Deaths by firearm in Montana
American duellists